Mullah Mohammad Abbas Akhund is an Afghan Taliban politician who is currently serving as Acting Minister of Disaster Management of the Islamic Emirate of Afghanistan since 23 November 2021. Abbas has also served as Minister of Public Health in the Taliban previous regime (1996-2001).

References

Living people
Taliban government ministers of Afghanistan
Public health ministers
Year of birth missing (living people)